Dejan Vukadinović (born 3 September 1980) is a Montenegrin retired footballer and football agent mostly in South East Asia.

He developed his connection with football in his native Montenegro, beginning as an active player, and established a network of associations and friendships across the football world.

Playing career
Born in Titograd, he had played with Montenegrin clubs FK Budućnost Podgorica and FK Mogren, Serbian clubs OFK Beograd and FK Vojvodina, German Fortuna Düsseldorf and 1. FC Schweinfurt 05, Hungarian Nyíregyháza Spartacus FC and Diósgyőri VTK and Czech FK Viktoria Žižkov.

In 2012, he signed for join Chainat.

Football agent career
In addition to numerous transfers in South Asia, Vukadinović's biggest achievement is signing head coach of Thailand national football team, Milovan Rajevac in April 2017.

External links
 
 Some early career stats at Srbijafudbal
 
 
 
 

1982 births
Living people
Footballers from Podgorica
Association football midfielders
Serbia and Montenegro footballers
Montenegrin footballers
FK Budućnost Podgorica players
OFK Beograd players
Fortuna Düsseldorf players
1. FC Schweinfurt 05 players
FK Mogren players
FK Vojvodina players
FK Kom players
FK Bokelj players
FK ČSK Čelarevo players
Nyíregyháza Spartacus FC players
FK Viktoria Žižkov players
Diósgyőri VTK players
MTK Budapest FC players
Dejan Vukadinovic
First League of Serbia and Montenegro players
Nemzeti Bajnokság I players
Czech First League players
Dejan Vukadinovic
Serbia and Montenegro expatriate footballers
Expatriate footballers in Germany
Serbia and Montenegro expatriate sportspeople in Germany
Montenegrin expatriate footballers
Expatriate footballers in Hungary
Montenegrin expatriate sportspeople in Hungary
Expatriate footballers in the Czech Republic
Montenegrin expatriate sportspeople in the Czech Republic
Expatriate footballers in Thailand
Montenegrin expatriate sportspeople in Thailand
Association football agents